The 1976–77 Scottish League Cup was the thirty-first season of Scotland's second football knockout competition. The competition was won by Aberdeen, who defeated Celtic in the Final.

First round

Group 1

Group 2

Group 3

Group 4

Group 5

Group 6

Group 7

Group 8

Group 9

Supplementary Round

First Leg

Second Leg

Quarter-finals

First Leg

Second Leg

Replays

Second Replay

Semi-finals

Ties

Final

References

General

Specific

League Cup
Scottish League Cup seasons